Brettschneider is a German surname. Brett means dimensional lumber and Schneider is taylor. Notable people with the surname include:

Blake Brettschneider (born 1989), American soccer player
Carl Brettschneider (1931–2014), American football player

See also
Bretschneider, a variant spelling

German-language surnames